The 2007 U.S. Women's Open was the 62nd U.S. Women's Open, held June 28 to July 1 at the Pine Needles Lodge and Golf Club in Southern Pines, North Carolina. Cristie Kerr won the first of her two major titles, two strokes ahead of runners-up Lorena Ochoa and Angela Park. The event was televised by ESPN and NBC Sports.

Due to weather delays, the third round began on Saturday afternoon and was completed on Sunday morning. Kerr shot 66 (−5) to gain the 54-hole lead at 209 (−4), one stroke ahead of top-ranked Ochoa, Morgan Pressel, and Jiyai Shin.

Pine Needles previously hosted the championship in 1996 and 2001; it joined Atlantic City Country Club (1948, 1965, 1975) as the only courses to host three U.S. Women's Opens.

Past champions in the field

Made the cut

Missed the cut

67 players made the cut at 148 (+6) or better

Course layout

Source:
Lengths of the course for previous U.S. Women's Opens:
2001: , par 70
1996: , par 70

Round summaries

First round
Thursday, June 28, 2007
Friday, June 29, 2007

Source:

Second round
Friday, June 29, 2007
Saturday, June 30, 2007

Source:

Third round
Saturday, June 30, 2007
Sunday, July 1, 2007

Final round
Sunday, July 1, 2007

Source:

Scorecard

Cumulative tournament scores, relative to par
Source:

References

External links

U.S. Women's Open - past champions - 2007

U.S. Women's Open
Golf in North Carolina
Sports competitions in North Carolina
U.S. Women's Open
U.S. Women's Open
U.S. Women's Open
U.S. Women's Open
U.S. Women's Open
Women's sports in North Carolina